Oud-Aa is a hamlet in the Dutch province of Utrecht (province). It is a part of the municipality of Stichtse Vecht, and lies about 13 km northeast of Woerden.

The hamlet was first mentioned in 1138 as "juxta lacum qui vocatur A", and refers to the Aa River which is a tributary of the Angstel River. Oud (old) has been added to distinguish from Nieuwer-Ter-Aa. The postal authorities have placed it under Breukelen, and there are no place name signs. The castle Ruwiel was located in Oud-Aa, however it was destroyed in 1673 by the French, and now contains a farm. In 1840, it was home to 315 people.

References

Populated places in Utrecht (province)
Stichtse Vecht